Katë Dulaj (9 November 1923 – 29 April 1969), known by her artistic name Katarina Josipi-Kati, was a Yugoslav actress of Albanian ethnicity. She performed on stage, and in radio plays, film, and television.

Early life
Katarina was born on 9 November 1923, one of four children of Gjin Dulaj and Gjyste (Prekpalaj) Dulaj, Mark, Lazer, Kati and Pal. Her family came from Tropoja and settled close to Prizreni, then in the Kingdom of Yugoslavia. Katarina Josipi began her education there, and continued it in Niš. Following the bombing of Niš during the Second World War in April 1941, Kati's father and family and many other people escaped from Niš; the Dulajs settled in Uroševac (Ferizaj). After completing her elementary education she attended three night-shift classes, training to become a tailor. Kati was arrested by Yugoslav authorities in 1947 and taken before a court together with her brother Lazer, as members of Albania National Democratic Organization and enemies of the people. 38 members of "Hamdi Berisha Group", all of them from Uroševac and vicinity, were arrested and tried in Gnjilane (Gjilan), from 1–7 February 1947; Katarina Josipi was the only woman. Following several months of investigation and reprisals they were released for lack of proof. She died when she was 46 years old on 29 April 1969 in Pristina (Prishtinë) city.

Career

Katarina Josipi acted on stage for the first time at the Amateur Theater in Uroševac. In spring 1948 she joined the Provincial People's Theater of Pristina, as the first actress. Kati acted in Pristina for 21 years; at the Professional Theater of Pristina she played with Nexhmije Pagarusha, Bekim Fehmiu, Muharrem Qena, Hyrie Hana, Istref Begolli, Xhevat Qena, Shani Pallaska, Malo Gami, Ragip Loxha, Kriste Berisha, Matej Serreqi, Shaban Gashi, Abdurrahman Shala, Melihate Ajeti, Leze Spaci Qena, Meribane Shala, Adelajde Sopi, Belxhyzare Domi, Qazim Dushku, Safete Rogova, Igballe Gjurkaj Qena, Melihate Qena, and so many others.

She was awarded numerous prizes and recognised by professional institutions of Kosova and elsewhere. The Original Play Competition of the National Theater of Pristina was named after her. The Prize for the most successful female role for comedy also carries her name (in Preševo), and the "Kati's Ring" Prize, granted annually to a professional actress for the best role in Prishtina, and also .

Theatre

Personal life
She was married to Hil Pjetri, an immigrant who had come from Kavajë. She had two children, both of whom fell ill and died in infancy. Her husband was later deported by the Yugoslav authorities.  Dulaj did not remarry, and would visit his wife and two children, both named after Kati's children.

References

Yugoslav actresses
1923 births
1969 deaths
People from Prizren
Yugoslav Catholics